The 2013 FC Astana season was the fifth successive season that Astana played in the Kazakhstan Premier League, the highest tier of association football in Kazakhstan. They also participate in the Kazakhstan Cup, reaching the quarter-finals, and the Europa League, where they were knocked out in the first qualifying round.

Squad

Transfers

Winter

In:

Out:

Summer

In:

Out:

Competitions

Kazakhstan Super Cup

Premier League

Regular season

Results summary

Results by round

Results

League table

Championship round

Results summary

Results by round

Results

League table

Kazakhstan Cup

UEFA Europa League

Qualifying rounds

Squad statistics

Appearances and goals

|-
|colspan="14"|Players who appeared for Astana that left during the season:

|}

Goal scorers

Clean sheets

Disciplinary record

References

FC Astana seasons
Astana
Astana